Goodbye is a 2022 Indian Hindi-language  family comedy-drama film written and directed by Vikas Bahl and produced by Bahl, Viraj Savant, Ekta Kapoor and Shobha Kapoor under their banners Good Co, Balaji Motion Pictures and Saraswati Entertainment Pvt Ltd. The film stars Amitabh Bachchan , Rashmika Mandanna (in her Hindi film debut) and Neena Gupta with, Sunil Grover, Pavail Gulati, Ashish Vidyarthi, Elli AvrRam, Sahil Mehta, Shivin Narang, Shayank Shukla, newcomer Abhishekh Khan and Arun Bali play supporting roles. This film featured Arun Bali's last performance, as he died shortly after film's release.

Goodbye was theatrically released on 7 October 2022 and received positive reviews from critics. In spite of having positive response from the critics the film failed at the box office.

Plot
The story centres on a dysfunctional household. Lawyer Tara Bhalla is staying with her partner Mudassar in Bengaluru. She leaves to party after winning her first case. Tara doesn't respond to calls or messages from her mother Gayatri. She finds out from the Bar Waiter that Gayatri has died, when her father Harish calls the same day. Her mother had called her to ask her about her first case.

To be with Harish, she quickly travels to her birthplace of Chandigarh. She has three brothers, Karan, Harish's eldest son, who lives in Los Angeles; Nakul, his second son; and an adoptive son named Angad, living in Dubai. Additionally, Karan and his American wife Daisy as well as Angad book the first flight to Chandigarh. Meanwhile, Nakul is unavailable due to him being on mountain climbing on Mount Everest and his phone is unreachable, his father leaves a message for him to see later. The first person there is Tara. She and Harish disagree about the cremation rites, and they argue about them.

Harish is also furious with Karan and Angad since he thinks they don't seem affected by the death of their mother. Fights break out in the home because of Harish's behaviour. However, none of them have a choice. For a few days, they must live together under one roof.

Cast
 Amitabh Bachchan as Harish Bhalla: Gayatri's husband, Karan, Angad, Nakul and Tara's father, Delna's foster father and Daisy's father-in-law
 Rashmika Mandanna as Tara Bhalla: Gayatri and Harish's only daughter, Karan, Nakul and Angad's only sister, Delna's foster sister and Daisy's sister-in-law
 Neena Gupta as Gayatri Bhalla: Harish's late wife, Karan, Angad, Nakul and Tara's mother and Daisy's mother-in-law
 Sunil Grover as Pandit ji: A modernistic pandit in Haridwar.
 Pavail Gulati as Karan Bhalla: Gayatri and Harish's eldest son, Daisy's husband and Nakul, Angad and Tara's elder brother and Delna's foster brother.
 Abhishekh Khan as Nakul Bhalla: Gayatri and Harish's second son, Karan, Angad and Tara's brother, Daisy's elder brother-in-law and Delna's foster brother.
 Sahil Mehta as Angad Bhalla: Gayatri and Harish's adoptive third son, Karan, Nakul and Tara's brother, Daisy's younger brother-in-law and Delna's love-interest.
 Payal Thapa as Delna: Gayatri and Harish's foster daughter and Karan, Nakul and Tara's foster sister and Angad's love-interest. She works as a househelper for the Bhalla's
 Shivin Narang as Mudassar, Tara's live-in boyfriend who is a DJ. Although Gayatri liked him but Harish disapproved of him as being a muslim.
 Elli AvrRam as Daisy Bhalla: Karan's wife, Gayatri and Harish's daughter-in-law and Nakul, Angad and Tara's sister-in-law.
 Ashish Vidyarthi as PP Singh, Harish's neighbour and friend
 Arun Bali as Gayatri's father
Neelu Kohli as Geeta, Gayatri's sister
 Rajni Basumatary as Delna's mother
 Shayank Shukla as Chintan
Teetu Verma as Tillu

Production
The film entered production on 2 April 2021 in Mumbai and the entire shoot was completed on 25 June 2022.

Music

The music of the film is composed by Amit Trivedi. Lyrics are written by Swanand Kirkire, Vikas Bahl and Amit Trivedi.

Reception 
Goodbye received positive reviews from critics.

Navneet Vyasan of News 18 rated the film 4 out of 5 stars and wrote "Vikas Bahl asks many questions in his latest film. It is hard to find loose ends in his film and even if it exists it proves to be inconsequential, unable to hamper the film's strong points". Rohit Bhatnagar of The Free Press Journal rated the film 4 out of 5 stars and wrote "Goodbye won't leave you soon but rather fiddle around your mind and make you rethink your equations with your family. It is a perfect family entertainer of the modern-day world but with strong roots". Kartik Bhardwaj of Cinema Express rated the film 4 out of 5 stars and wrote "The Amitabh Bachchan, Rashmika Mandanna starrer is an emotional ride with its heart in the right place". Ganesh Aaglave of Firstpost rated the film 3.5 out of 5 stars and wrote "The emotional roller-coaster will make you smile, laugh and cry with every character making a special place in our hearts. The film deserves a special mention for the beautiful montages". Mayur Sanap of Rediff rated the film 3.5 out of 5 stars and wrote "Goodbye is embedded with solid emotional moments, a few chuckles and some nice ponderings upon life, love and everything inbetween. With its heart in the right place, the film is perfectly efficient and likable in both jerking tears and soliciting laughs". Princia Hendriques of Mashable India rated the film 3.5 out of 5 stars and wrote "In the era of power-packed, adrenaline-filled cinematic treats, Goodbye provides a breather for the audience to gather their family". Sanchita Jhunjhunwala of Zoom rated the film 3.5 out of 5 stars and wrote "Goodbye is the kind of film that's all heart, and is a sob-fest but also has ample of moments that will make you laugh through the tears". Sonal Verma of Zee News rated the film 3.5 out of 5 stars and wrote "Goodbye has proven that not everything is a myth and that not every myth is wrong. Vikas Bahl's family dramedy will take you on an emotional ride full of hurdles, tears and laughs all together". Grace Cyril of India Today rated the film 3.5 out of 5 stars and wrote "Goodbye is filled with heartwarming and heartbreaking moments. The unfiltered emotions in the film touch the right chord and even bring you closer to your loved ones".

Renuka Vyavahare of The Times of India rated the film 3 out of 5 stars and wrote "Goodbye is a story of a family coping with grief and laughing through their pain. Keep the tissues handy before watching this one". Tina Das of The Print rated the film 3 out of 5 stars and wrote "Amitabh Bachchan steals the show, and is only challenged by the iridescent Neena Gupta in Goodbye". 
Bollywood Hungama rated the film 2.5 out of 5 stars and wrote "Goodbye works due to the touching moments, relatability factor, and performances. However, the film suffers due to the bizarre developments, weak second half, and depressive tone". Shubhra Gupta of The Indian Express rated the film 2.5 out of 5 stars and wrote "Amitabh Bachchan-Rashmika Mandana's film delivers broad humour and heavy-handed sentimentality, which succeeds best when the emotion occasionally swims to the top without the belabouring". Saibal Chatterjee of NDTV rated the film 2 out of 5 stars and wrote "Goodbye is crafted to deliver an unabashed workout for the lachrymal glands. Its grievously shallow methods undermine its avowed purpose". Pratikshya Mishra of The Quint rated the film 2 out of 5 stars and wrote "Goodbye is constantly asking you to feel something or the other till it comes to an end with a half-baked lesson on 'compromise'. A more concise script, fewer characters, and trust in the audience would've gone a long way for a film like Goodbye".

Box-office
Movie earned ₹0.93 crore at the domestic box office on its opening day. Its gross collection stands at ₹3.78 crores in first weekend.

References

External links 
 
 Goodbye at Bollywood Hungama

Balaji Motion Pictures films
Indian comedy-drama films
Films about dysfunctional families
2022 comedy-drama films
2020s Hindi-language films